This is a list of poets writing in Turkic languages.

11th–12th century
Mahmud al-Kashgari, poet (1005–1102)
Yusuf Balasaguni, poet (1019–1085)
Ahmad Yasawi, poet, mystic (1093–1166)
Arslan Baba, poet, mystic

13th–14th century
Yunus Emre, poet, mystic and Dervish Sufi (1240–1320)
Izzeddin "Hasanoglu" Esfaryani, poet, (13th - 14th centuries)
Köroğlu, a poet of the ashik tradition
Kaygusuz Abdal, Alevi folk poet, (1341-1444)
Kadi Burhan al-Din, (1345–1398)
Pir Sultan Abdal, (1480-1550)

15th–16th century
Nasimi, (1369–1417)
Ali Şir Nevai, poet (1441–1501)
Pir Sultan Abdal (1480–1550)
Khatai, (1487–1524)
Gül Baba, (d. 1541)
Muhibbi, (1494–1566)
Fuzûlî, poet (1483–1556)
Babur, poet (1483-1530)

17th–18th–19th century
Karacaoğlan (c. 1606-c. 1680)
Aşıq Ümer (1621–1707), Crimean Tatar poet-ashik
Yusuf Nabi (1642–1712)
Magtymguly Pyragy (1724–1807), Turkmen poet, songwriter and intellectual
Kul Nesîmî (17th century), Alevi-Bektashi poet
Ahmet Nedîm Efendi (c. 1681–1730)
Bukhar-zhirau Kalmakanov, poet (1693-1789)
Erzurumlu Emrah, poet (1775–1854)
Dadaloğlu, (c. 1785–c. 1868)
Abay Qunanbayuli, (1845-1904), poet, composer and philosopher

20th century
Ismail Gasprinski, Crimean Tatar poet, publisher, intellectual (1851–1914)
Mirjaqip Dulatuli (1885-1935) - poet, writer and a leader of Alash Orda government
Akhmet Baytursinuli (1873-1937) - poet, writer, pedagogue and politician
Neyzen Tevfik, poet (1879–1953)
Magzhan Zhumabayev, poet (1893– 1938)
Yahya Kemal Beyatlı, poet (1884–1958)
Noman Çelebicihan, Crimean Tatar leader and poet (1885–1918)
Bekir Çoban-zade, Crimean Tatar poet and professor of Turkic languages (1893–1937)
Faruk Nafiz Çamlıbel, poet (1898–1973)
Nazim Hikmet Ran, poet (1901–1963)
Ahmet Hamdi Tanpınar, poet, novelist, essayist (1901–1962)
Ahmet Kutsi Tecer, poet, dramatist (1901–1967)
Necip Fazıl Kısakürek, poet, essayist (1905–1983)
Mohammad-Hossein Shahriar, poet (1906–1988)
Ahmet Muhip Dıranas, poet (1909–1980)
Cahit Sıtkı Tarancı, poet (1910–1956)
Rıfat Ilgaz, poet, writer, journalist (1911–1993)
Bedri Rahmi Eyüboğlu, painter and poet (1913–1975)
Oktay Rıfat Horozcu, poet (1914–1988)
Orhan Veli Kanik, poet (1914–1950)
Melih Cevdet Anday, poet (1915-2002)
Alykul Osmonov, poet (1915-1950)
Âşık Veysel, ashik, poet (1894-1973)
Behçet Necatigil, poet, dramatist (1916–1979)
Ilhan Berk, poet (1918-2008)
Necati Cumalı, poet, dramatist (1921–2001)
Bahtiyar Vahapzade, poet (1925–2009)
Can Yücel, poet (1926–1999)
Ümit Yaşar Oğuzcan, poet, author (1926-1984)
Edip Cansever, poet (1928–1986)
Ece Ayhan Çağlar, poet (1931–2002)
Talat Sait Halman, poet (1931–2014)
Cemal Süreya, poet (1931–1990)
Onat Kutlar, writer, poet (1936–1995)
Aşık Mahzuni Şerif, ashik, poet (1939-2002)
Attila Ilhan, writer, poet, captain (1925–2005)

21st century
Abdurehim Ötkür, poet (1923-1995)
Sabit İnce, writer, poet (1954)
Ismet Özel, poet (1944–)
Haydar Ergülen, poet (1956–)
Sunay Akın, poet, writer (1962–)
Abdurehim Heyt, poet, singer (1962-)
Süreyya Aylin Antmen (1981–)

See also
List of contemporary Turkish poets
List of Ottoman poets
Turkish literature

References

Poets
Turkic
Poets
Poets
Poets

de:Liste türkischer Schriftsteller